Andrej Málek (born 1995) is a retired Slovak slalom canoeist who competed at the international level from 2010 to 2019. He retired from the sport in 2020.

He won a silver medal in the K1 team event at the 2015 ICF Canoe Slalom World Championships in London. He also won a bronze medal in the K1 event at the 2015 European Canoe Slalom Championships in Markkleeberg.

World Cup individual podiums

References

External links 

 Andrej MALEK at CanoeSlalom.net

Slovak male canoeists
Living people
1995 births
Medalists at the ICF Canoe Slalom World Championships